The Lacemaker is a 1977 French drama film directed by Claude Goretta and starring Isabelle Huppert and Yves Beneyton.  It is based on the 1974 Prix Goncourt winning novel La Dentellière by Pascal Lainé.

Plot
In Paris, the shy and virginal Béatrice (known as "Pomme") lives with her mother and works in a hairdressing salon, where her only friend is the lively Marylène. Left by her lover, Marylène suggests that the two girls take a holiday by the sea at Cabourg. There Marylène soon goes off with a new man, leaving Béatrice on her own.

Befriended by the shy student François, the two become lovers and Béatrice moves into his room in Paris. Though he introduces her to his well-off parents and his intellectual friends, she is unable to mix in their worlds. Her deep reserve begins to annoy him and they split up. Losing interest in life, she ends up in a mental hospital.

Full of remorse, François visits her but she wants nothing: she has found a quiet place that suits her inwardness. In her silent anonymity, she is like the unknown girls in paintings such as Vermeer's The Lacemaker.

Cast
 Isabelle Huppert as Pomme
 Yves Beneyton as François
 Florence Giorgetti as Marylène
 Annemarie Düringer as Pomme's mother (as Anne-Marie Düringer)
 Renate Schroeter as François' girlfriend (as Renata Schroeter)
 Michel de Ré as the painter
 Monique Chaumette as the mother of François
 Jean Obé as the father of François
 Christian Baltauss as Gérard
 Gilberte Géniat (as Gilberte Geniat)
 Sabine Azéma as Corinne (as Sabine Azema)

Awards and nominations
BAFTA Awards (UK) 
Won: Most Promising Newcomer to Leading Film Roles (Isabelle Huppert)
1977 Cannes Film Festival (France) 
Won Prize of the Ecumenical Jury (Claude Goretta; tied with J.A. Martin photographe)
Nominated: Golden Palm (Claude Goretta)
César Awards (France)
Nominated: Best Actress – Leading Role (Isabelle Huppert)
Nominated: Best Actress – Supporting Role (Florence Giorgetti)
Nominated: Best Film
David di Donatello Awards (Italy)
Won: Best Foreign Actress (Isabelle Huppert)

See also
 List of Isabelle Huppert performances

References

External links

1977 films
1977 drama films
French drama films
1970s French-language films
Films directed by Claude Goretta
Films based on French novels
Films set in Paris
1970s French films